Priceless is a compilation album by Elkie Brooks.

Compiled in 1991, it was released on CD and cassette in the same year by Pickwick Records.

Track listing
"Fool If You Think It's Over"
"Warm and Tender Love"
"Only Love Can Break Your Heart"
"Superstar"
"Blue Moon"
"If You Leave Me Now"
"Sunshine After the Rain"
"Don’t Cry Out Loud"
"Pearl's a Singer"
"What'll I Do"
"Nights in White Satin"
"Goin' Back"
"Our Love"
"Love Me or Leave Me"
"Too Busy Thinking 'bout My Baby"
"Lilac Wine"

References

1991 compilation albums
Elkie Brooks albums
Pickwick Records compilation albums